Yes, My Love (Spanish: Sí, mi vida) is a 1953 Mexican musical comedy film directed by Fernando Méndez and starring Lilia Michel, Rafael Baledón and Pedro Infante.

Cast
 Lilia Michel as Lilia  
 Rafael Baledón as Rafael  
 Pedro Infante as Cameo  
 María Victoria as Cantante  
 Pedro Vargas as Cantante  
 Mario Rey as Cantante  
 Los Churumbeles de España as Cantantes  
 Carlota Solares as Alegria  
 Carlos Martínez Baena as Doctor Amado Castellanos  
 Carlos Riquelme as Jaime  
 Rafael Banquells as Valentín Chagoya 
 Ernesto Finance as Jefe Demetrius  
 Sergio Virel as Joven pretendiente de Lilia 
 Lupe del Castillo as Señorita directora  
 Héctor Mateos as Dr. Zavala 
 Guillermo Cramer as Esbirro de Demetrius  
 Omar Jasso as Mensajero  
 Chel López as Esbirro de Demetrius  
 Agustín Fernández as Esbirro de Demetrius  
 Concepción Martínez as Profesora  
 Magdalena G. de Banquells as Profesora  
 Alberto 'Chivo' Córdoba 
 Eduardo 'Pocho' Herrera 
 Omar Cárdona 
 Silvia Pinal as Leticia 
 Armando Acosta as Hombre en restaurante  
 Pancho Córdova as Locutor 
 Julio Daneri as Cobrador  
 Eulalio González 
 Alfonso Iglesias Padre as Miembro facultad  
 Consuelo Monteagudo as Mujer cegata
 Yolanda Montes as Bailarina  
 José Pardavé as  Hércules 
 Ignacio Peón as Licenciado

References

Bibliography 
  David E. Wilt. Stereotyped Images of United States Citizens in Mexican Cinema, 1930-1990. University of Maryland at College Park, 1991.

External links 
 

1953 films
1953 musical comedy films
Mexican musical comedy films
1950s Spanish-language films
Films directed by Fernando Méndez
Mexican black-and-white films
1950s Mexican films